The Key to Theosophy is an 1889 book by Helena Blavatsky, expounding the principles of theosophy in a readable question-and-answer manner. It covers Theosophy and the Theosophical Society, Nature of the Human Being, Life After Death, Reincarnation, Kama-Loka and Devachan, the Human Mind, Practical Theosophy and the Mahatmas. The book is an introduction to Theosophical mysticism and esoteric doctrine.

Nonviolent activist Mohandas Gandhi spoke of it in his autobiography:
"This book stimulated in me the desire to read books on Hinduism, and disabused me of the notion fostered by the missionaries that Hinduism was rife with superstition."

See also 
 "Is Theosophy a Religion?"
 Theosophy and Buddhism
 Christianity and Theosophy
 Theosophy and Western philosophy
 "What Is Theosophy?"

References

External links

Blavatsky, Helena P. (1889). The Key to Theosophy. London: The Theosophical Publishing Company. Theosophy Trust Books. 2007. . Theosophical University Press Online Edition: The Key to Theosophy by H. P. Blavatsky. .
The Key to Theosophy. United Lodge of Theosophists - Phoenix Arizona. 2002. "Scanned Reproduction from a Photographic Reproduction of the Original Edition as First Issued at London, England: 1889".

1889 non-fiction books
Books by Helena Blavatsky
Theosophical texts